John Methuen may refer to:
 John Methuen (priest), Anglican priest
 John Methuen (diplomat), English diplomat, judge and member of parliament
 John Methuen, 6th Baron Methuen, British peer